Gwendolyn Fiel Garcia (born October 12, 1955) is a Filipina politician serving as the governor of Cebu since 2019, a position she previously held from 2004 and 2013—being the first woman to hold that office. She was the representative of Cebu's 3rd congressional district from 2013 to 2019 and concurrently served as a House Deputy Speaker from 2016 to 2018.

From December 2012 to June 2013, Garcia was suspended by the Office of the President following her conviction of graft by the Sandiganbayan.

Personal life
Garcia was born on October 12, 1955. She is the eldest daughter of former Cebu Governor and House Deputy Speaker Pablo P. Garcia (1925–2021) and Judge Esperanza "Inday" Fiel García (1931–2016).

Her youngest brother, Pablo John Garcia, is a lawyer-congressman.

Another brother, Byron Garcia, has been a security consultant for the Cebu Provincial Detention and Rehabilitation Center (CPDRC), which caught global attention in 2007 for its rendition of Michael Jackson's "Thriller" featuring its inmates.

Another brother, Winston Garcia, is the former general manager of the Government Service Insurance System (Philippines). 

Another brother, Marlon Garcia, is currently the Mayor of the Municipality of Barili, Cebu.

Gwendolyn Garcia was previously married to Eufrocino "Winnie" Codilla Jr., the son of former Representative Eufrocino Codilla Sr., Leyte's 4th congressional district. She has three children including Christina Frasco.

Education and career

Garcia studied at Cebu's St. Theresa's College. She earned her Bachelor of Arts degree in Broadcast Communication from the University of the Philippines Diliman and studied law at the same university. She was awarded with the honorary degrees of Doctor of Humanities from Cebu Normal University (CNU) and Doctor of Philosophy in Technology Management from Cebu State College of Science and Technology (CSCST).

Prior to being elected as governor, she was responsible for instituting various reforms at the Cebu Provincial Capitol as a Consultant on Systems Promotion and Development for three years. Earlier, she was Consultant on Financial Affairs and assisted her father in expanding the province's resources.

She was active in the private sector as chairperson of the Leyte Cooperative Bank from 1996 to 1998. She is, since 1998, the president and CEO of the GGC Group, Inc.

She is the head of the Regional Development Council, the Regional Peace and Order Council, and chairman of the Visayas RDCom (comprising RDC 6, RDC 7 and RDC 8), the Deputy Secretary General for Visayas of the League of Provinces of the Philippines (LPP), chairman of the board of the Mactan Cebu Bridge Management Board (MCBMB), and member of the board of the Mactan Cebu International Airport Authority (MCIAA).

Political career
Garcia first entered politics in 2004, when she was elected as governor by 7,000 votes to succeed her father. Three years later, in 2007, she was reelected overwhelmingly, obtaining a lead of 500,000 votes. In 2010, she defeated Hilario Davide III, son of former Chief Justice Hilario Davide, Jr., for a third and final term by almost 100,000 votes.

Garcia is locally dubbed as the "So-called Iron Lady of Cebu" or the "Iron Lady of Southern Philippines" after preserving the territorial integrity of Cebu and putting the province back as the richest province in the country.

During her three terms, Gov. Garcia claimed to have pursued a 12-point agenda for her administration, implementing economically viable development programs that effectively responded to the needs of the Cebuano constituency – in infrastructure, water, power, health, education, agriculture and food production, women and children, business, tourism and the environment. This, later on, became her 12-point plus 2 agenda of the government, with the inclusion of an enhanced information and communication portfolio that showcase the Province of Cebu and strong international relations aimed at creating beneficial linkages with the global community.

She publicly declared an all-out war against a communist insurgency and proceeded to put in place measures to achieve such end, resulting in the declaration of Cebu as an insurgency-free zone.  The anti-criminality task forces of the Province bring to justice perpetrators of illegal fishing, those involved in the illegal drug trade and in human trafficking.

Garcia was elected as the representative of the third congressional district on May 13, 2013, over Pinamungahan Mayor Geraldine Yapha. 

On February 12, 2018, the Office of the Ombudsman dismissed her from service for grave misconduct in connection with the purchase of a sprawling property underwater for close to P100 million. However, on April 23, 2014, the Court of Appeals (CA) Special 18th Division in Cebu City cleared Garcia of grave misconduct over the same case.

During the 2019 Philippine election, Gwen Garcia running under the banner of PDP-Laban / One Cebu Party coalition, won against Liberal Party candidate Agnes Magpale as Governor of Cebu Province. Her brother Pablo John Garcia won the seat she vacated – the third congressional district of Cebu of the House of Representatives.

Controversies and criticisms

Suspension 
On December 19, 2012, Garcia was suspended by the office of then President Aquino for 6 months for grave abuse of authority. Cebu Vice-Governor Agnes Magpale, was sworn immediately into office as acting governor. Despite this, Garcia said she remains to be the governor. She dared police on December 20, 2012, to forcibly remove her from the governor's office where she has been holed up since Wednesday after she was ordered suspended for six months, saying her removal could only happen "over my dead body."

Graft charges 
In 2016, Garcia faced 11 counts of graft for the anomalous construction of the Cebu International Convention Center (CICC) in 2006.

In 2018, the Philippine anti-graft office Sandiganbayan has begun to build up a criminal case against then Cebu Rep. Gwendolyn Garcia and other officials on the acquisition of the Balili property in 2008. In 2020, the anti-graft court dismissed the charges against Garcia and seven others.

Court of Appeals (CA) Reversal of Ombudsman Dismissal Order 
In 2018, Ombudsman Conchita Carpio-Morales ordered her dismissal from service for grave misconduct in connection with the purchase of a P98.9-million property in Barili, Naga, Cebu. More than half of property was discovered to be submerged underwater and was party of a mangrove area. In 2012, Garcia tapped Supreme ABF Construction to supply backfilling materials for the submerged portion of the land for P24.47 million. The Ombudsman however found that Garcia had no authority from the Sangguniang Panlalawigan (SP) when she entered into the contract with the firm. 

This dismissal from service has been reversed by the Court of Appeals (CA) in 2019. The decision of the CA Special Division of Five was promulgated on May 10, 2019, three days before election day. If was signed by five associate justices but with two dissenting. The reversal of CA allowed Gwen Garcia to run as Governor of Cebu which she won against Agnes Magpale.

COVID-19 pandemic: public shaming and promotion of alternative medicine

On May 18, 2020, Garcia held a briefing with the local press where she usually goes over the latest COVID-19 updates in the province. This briefing was also aired on Facebook Live. During the press conference, she pulled out large sheets of paper with Facebook comments printed on them, while having the posts broadcast on half the screen through Sugbo News, the province's public information office. Garcia began to publicly shame a netizen in retaliation for Facebook comments criticizing and insulting her and her provincial government. This action was met with criticism and backlash on social media, as well as the Commission on Human Rights (CHR) for publicly exposing and belittling the personal information of said netizen.

In another incident on June 23, 2020, Garcia extensively shamed a doctor who had criticized the local mandate of relying on tuob (steam inhalation) to treat possible symptoms of novel coronavirus disease 2019 (COVID-19). Garcia questioned the doctor's qualifications and undermined her years of experience, even telling her to run for office if she was confident about her medical knowledge. This event was once again met with tremendous backlash online, especially from those within the medical community.

Probe into Garcia brothers' deaths
Governor Gwen Garcia, with Congressman Pablo Garcia, launched an inquiry to ascertain the death of her brothers: former Barili Mayor Nelson Garcia and Dumanjug Mayor Marlon Garcia. Rep. Garcia said their brothers tested positive for COVID-19 "but they recovered and what happened after was the cause of their deaths." Governor said that based on the death certificate, Nelson Garcia died due to "immediate cardio pulmonary arrest secondary to probable massive embolism". For Marlon Garcia, the cause of death was "septic shock secondary to catheter related blood stream infection, ventilator associated pneumonia."

References

External links
https://archive.today/20121221070742/http://cebu.gov.ph/listindex.asp?newsid=9&category=governor&whatarticle=4&wfunc=viewarticle&rightpanel=yes

1955 births
Living people
Cebuano people
Governors of Cebu
One Cebu politicians
Women members of the House of Representatives of the Philippines
Members of the House of Representatives of the Philippines from Cebu
PDP–Laban politicians
Lakas–CMD politicians
United Nationalist Alliance politicians
People from Cebu
Gwendolyn
University of the Philippines Diliman alumni
Deputy Speakers of the House of Representatives of the Philippines
Women provincial governors of the Philippines
Grand Crosses of the Order of Lakandula